Frost Fire Park is a modest alpine ski area and chairlift access Mountain Bike Park in the midwestern United States, in the Pembina River Gorge of northeastern North Dakota.

Started in 1976, Frost Fire Park has one quad-seat chairlift and a magic carpet, with 7 runs, ski and snowboard rentals, certified ski and snowboard instructors, day lodge, and Howatt Hangar Bar and Grill. It does not offer tubing. It has an outdoor amphitheater, which hosts several plays and musicals during the summer. An "upside-down" area, the parking lot and lodge are near the top of the ski runs.

After 40 years, Frost Fire Ski and Snowboard Area was purchased by the Pembina Gorge Foundation. The Foundation changed the name to "Frost Fire Park" since it will no longer be a single season venue. Summer offers downhill mountain biking with 8 full downhill trails with varying degrees of difficulty, with chair lift service back to the top.

Frost Fire Park purchased a new quad-seat chair lift with 57 seats total, to replace the very old ski lift that has been out of order since 2015.

References

External links

Previous official website
Frost Fire Theatre

Buildings and structures in Cavalier County, North Dakota
Ski areas and resorts in North Dakota
Tourist attractions in Cavalier County, North Dakota